Benjamin Arthur is the stage name of Benjamin Arthur Gutknecht, a Canadian actor from Kitimat, British Columbia. He is most noted for his regular role as Josh Blecher in the television comedy series Less Than Kind, for which he won the Gemini Award for Individual Performance in a Comedy Program or Series at the 25th Gemini Awards in 2010.

He was previously nominated in the same category at the 24th Gemini Awards in 2009.

Filmography

Film

Television

References

External links

21st-century Canadian male actors
Canadian male film actors
Canadian male television actors
Canadian Screen Award winners
Male actors from British Columbia
People from Kitimat
Living people
Year of birth missing (living people)